The 1922 Cork Intermediate Hurling Championship was the 13th staging of the Cork Intermediate Hurling Championship since its establishment by the Cork County Board. It was the first championship to be completed since 1919 because of the War of Independence.

Castletreasure won the championship following a 3-1 to 2-0 defeat of Inniscarra in the final.

Results

Final

References

Cork Intermediate Hurling Championship
Cork Intermediate Hurling Championship